Spice Digital Limited (formerly registered as Cellebrum Technologies) is an Indian telecommunications company headquartered in Noida, India, a subsidiary of Spice Connect. The company deals in Mobile Value Added Services, along with Telco Solutions, enterprise solutions, financial technology, GST Suvidha Provider (GSP), and digital transformation products and services.

Spice Money provides multiple services to merchants and retail counters and is available in seven Indian languages and offers services like money transfer/remittance(DMT), based mini ATM, mobile recharges, utility bill payments BBPS, travel booking, MPOS, buy insurance and buy/sell gold. It is involved in micro-payment of services and remittances in real time i.e. where sender provides cash and the recipient receives money electronically in their bank account simultaneously.

History
Spice Digital was incorporated in 2000 by Bhupendra Kumar Modi with a staff of 13. In July 2006, the company invested Rs 100 crores to soup up its technology and expand its product line and set up a Rs 50 crore incubation fund for startup ventures. By 2006, the company employed 400 people. It revamped its operations in 2007 to enhance its research and development capabilities.

Timeline 
2000:

Company inception - servicing telecom operators in India.

2009:

SDL incorporated Spice VAS Africa (SVA) with a local managing partner.

2012:

SDL started new business units:
 Data Analytics
 Financial Services - Spice Money 
 Mobile Internet 
 Mobile Marketing 
 Enterprise Mobility
2013:

Launched B2B Travel & Tourism solution with the business name Spice Money.

2014:

Launched premium e-ticketing platform bdtickets.com in Bangladesh.

2015:
 Invested in technology firm Creative Function Apps
 Acquired stake in Anytime Learning Private Limited
 Received PPI License from RBI
 Launched mobile wallet 'Spice Money' focusing on domestic remittances

2016:
 Formed a joint venture with Adgyde Solutions for building analytics-based solutions
 In principal approval from RBI to operate under Bharat Bill Payment System
 Created IoT Solutions for smart homes and smart cities

2017:
 Launched Aadhar enabled payment system services
 Launched Bharat bill payment system services
 Expanded businesses in Indonesia and Dubai

2018:

 In Mid of 2018, Spice Money reached a gross transaction value of $1 billion

Products and services
Spice Digital received a semi-closed pre-paid payment wallet license from the Reserve Bank of India (RBI) on 9 April 2015. The license was valid up to 30 June 2020.

Acquisitions and subsidiaries

Spice Digital (Africa)
In early 2010, operations were started in Africa with headquarters in Nairobi, Kenya. In 2013, after massive expansion, the headquarters was shifted to Johannesburg, South Africa.

DiGiSPICE

Vavia Technology 
On September 5, 2014, Spice Digital acquired 26 per cent (3,514) equity shares in share capital of Bangalore-based startup Vavia Technologies.

Spice Digital has since divested its entire equity stake of 26 percent in Vavia Technologies.

Anytime Learning 
In January 2015, Spice Digital acquired 38.53% stake in Anytime Learning Private Limited, the Noida-based online education provider. Consequently, Anytime Learning has become an Associate Company of Spice Digital.

Spice Stellar Mobile Series
This is a series of mobiles launched by Spice Digital. As of February 2013 this series has five Android smartphones, including a tablet. They are Stellar Xtacy (known as mi-352), Stellar Craze (known as mi-335), Stellar Nhance (known as mi-435), Stellar Pad (known as mi-1010), Stellar Virtuoso (known as mi-495), and Stellar Pinnacle (known as mi-530). 

On 4 July 2014, Spice launched its all-new Stellar 445 budget quad-core smartphone in India.

Spice Mobile launched the new budget smartphone Stallar 405 in India.

See also
 Spice Telecom

References

Technology companies of India
Telecommunications companies of India
Companies based in Noida
Telecommunications companies established in 2000
Mobile phone manufacturers
Indian brands
Mobile payments in India
2000 establishments in Uttar Pradesh
Indian companies established in 2000